Henuttawy (or Henttawy, Henuttaui) (ḥnw.t-t3.wỉ, “Mistress of the Two Lands [=Egypt]”, from ḥnw.t, 'mistress' and t3.wỉ, dual for t3, 'land') is the name of several royal ladies from Ancient Egypt.

 Henuttawy (19th dynasty), princess, daughter of Ramesses II (19th Dynasty)
 Henuttawy A, better known as Duathathor-Henuttawy, wife of Pinedjem I, mother of Psusennes I (20th − 21st Dynasty)
 Henuttawy B, princess and chantress of Amun, daughter of Pinedjem I (21st Dynasty)
 Henuttawy C, probably daughter of Menkheperre, sister-wife of Smendes II (21st Dynasty)
 Henuttawy D, God's Wife of Amun, possibly a daughter of Pinedjem II (21st Dynasty)
 Henuttawy E, priestess and chantress, died during the pontificate of Menkheperre (21st Dynasty)
 Henuttawy Q, today believed to be the same of Henuttawy A
 Henuttawy, priestess (21st Dynasty), mainly known for being one of the so-called "cocaine mummies"
 Henuttawy, Chantress of Amun, owner of tomb MMA 59

Ancient Egyptian given names
Egyptian feminine given names